Aida Muratovna Gaistenova (Aida Mūratqyzy Gaistenova, born 21 May 1994) is a Kazakh footballer who plays as a midfielder and has appeared for the Kazakhstan women's national team who currently plays for Zenit the highest division of women's professional soccer in the Top Division. Is a resident of fiftywan corporation and the face of the global sports brand Adidas.

Career
Gaistenova has been capped for the Kazakhstan national team, appearing for the team during the 2019 FIFA Women's World Cup qualifying cycle.

The midfielder of the Okzhetpes club later moved to the ZhFC Astana, from where she received a call to the women's national team of Kazakhstan.

Since the beginning of 2017, Aida has played for SSHVSM-Barys.

On February 21, 2018, the Krasnoyarsk Yenisei announced the transfer of Gaistenova. The agreement is for a year. This transfer was the first in the history of women's football in Kazakhstan.

The only girl from Kazakhstan who was included in the TOP-10 rating of the sexiest football players in the world.

On April 10, 2019 it became known that Aida will continue her career in the Russian football club "Zvezda-2005". As part of the team, she made her debut in the first round of the Russian championship against the capital Lokomotiv.

On June 20, 2019, she scored a double in the 1/8 finals of the Russian Cup against Ufa. The meeting ended with a major victory for the Permians with a score of 10:0.

She scored her debut goal for Zvezda-2005 in the Russian championship against the reigning champion Ryazan-VDV and brought her team a victory in the eleventh round. As part of Zvezda-2005 ZhFK, she won the 2019 Russian Cup.

In December 2019, she joined the Common Goal project, which aims to fund football charitable foundations around the world.

Supports the NGO FARE Network, which brings together everyone who is committed to fighting inequality and discrimination in football and uses sport as a tool for social inclusion [source not specified 558 days].

In the 2020 season, her transfer to Zenit was officially announced.

In July 2020, she signed a sponsorship deal with Adidas.

International goals

Achievements 

 Silver medalist of the championship of Kazakhstan (3);
 Bronze medalist of the championship of Kazakhstan (3);
 Cup Winner Kazakhstan (2);
 Russian Cup Winner: 2019

Financials
Aida is known to be one of the best paid players in the CIS Women's game, but have at several occasions rejected offers that would have made her the absolute best paid player her saying she don't play for money.

Personal life
Gaistenova were the first female players in the Russian Federation and CIS countries to sign up for the Common Goal campaign, created by Juan Mata of Manchester United, wherein players donate 1% of their wages to support soccer-related charities

References

External links
 
 
 
 

1994 births
Living people
Kazakhstani women's footballers
Kazakhstan women's international footballers
Women's association football defenders
Zvezda 2005 Perm players
ZFK Zenit Saint Petersburg players